Following is a list of senators of Aude, people who have represented the department of Aude in the Senate of France.

Third Republic

Senators for Aude under the French Third Republic were:

 Charles Lambert de Sainte-Croix (1876-1885)
 Pierre-Louis Beraldi (1876-1885)
 Théophile Marcou (1885-1893)
 Émile Lades-Gout (1885-1893)
 Eugène Mir (1894-1921)
 Jules Rivals (1894) – election invalidated 
 Armand Gauthier (1894-1926)
 Auguste Barbaza (1904-1912)
 Étienne Dujardin-Beaumetz (1912-1913)
 Maurice Sarraut (1913-1932)
 Jean Durand (1921-1936)
 Albert Sarraut (1926-1940)
 Clément Raynaud (1932-1940)
 Jacques Guilhem (1937-1940)

Fourth Republic

Senators for Aude under the French Fourth Republic were:

 Baptiste Roudel (1946–1948)
 Émile Roux (1948–1959)
 Antoine Courrière (1946–1959)

Fifth Republic 
Senators for Aude under the French Fifth Republic:

References

Sources

 
Lists of members of the Senate (France) by department